New Semnan Airport  is an airport serving the city of Semnan, in the Semnan Province of Iran. It is located within the Semnan Air Defense Base and is mainly used for military purposes. In particular, it features the Islamic Republic of Iran's most active pilot training and simulation facilities. The facility also includes an aerospace research center.

References

Airports in Iran
Semnan County
Semnan Province
Buildings and structures in Semnan Province